Mark Stevens (born February 19, 1962) is a former American football and Canadian football quarterback in the National Football League (NFL) and Canadian Football League (CFL). He played in the CFL for the Montreal Concordes / Alouettes and the NFL for the San Francisco 49ers. He played college football at Purdue and Utah.

Raised in Passaic, New Jersey, Stevens attended Passaic High School.

References

1962 births
Living people
Passaic High School alumni
Sportspeople from Passaic, New Jersey
Players of American football from New Jersey
American football quarterbacks
Canadian football quarterbacks
Purdue Boilermakers football players
Utah Utes football players
Montreal Concordes players
Montreal Alouettes players
San Francisco 49ers players
National Football League replacement players